Cırdaxan or Dzhirdakhan or Dzhyrdakhan may refer to:
Cırdaxan, Barda, Azerbaijan
Cırdaxan, Samukh, Azerbaijan
Cırdaxan, Yevlakh, Azerbaijan